Mario Bazina (born 8 September 1975) is a Croatian former professional footballer who played as a midfielder.

Club career
Bazina played for Austrian club, Grazer AK for five years and one year with Rapid Wien and for Croatian sides Hrvatski Dragovoljac and Dinamo Zagreb. He was the Croatian First League's player of the year for the 1998–99 season and the Austrian footballer of the year for 2005. He last played as an attacking midfielder for Austria Wien in the Austrian Bundesliga having signed with the club until 2009.

International career
Bazina made his debut for the Croatia national team in an August 2002 friendly match against Wales, coming on as a second half substitute for Milan Rapaić. It remained his sole international appearance.

Personal life
Bazina resides in Široki Brijeg, Bosnia-Herzegovina, with his wife Ana Bazina, and his two sons Hrvoje Bazina and Matej Bazina.

Honours
Dinamo Zagreb
Croatian Cup: 2000–01

Grazer AK
Austrian Bundesliga: 2003–04
Austrian Cup: 2000–01, 2003–04
Austrian Supercup: 2002

Rapid Wien
Austrian Bundesliga: 2007–08
UEFA Intertoto Cup: 2007

Austria Wien
Austrian Cup: 2008–09

Individual
SN Yellow Shirt: 1998
Austrian Footballer of the Year: 2005

References

External links
 
 
 

1975 births
Living people
People from Široki Brijeg
Croats of Bosnia and Herzegovina
Association football midfielders
Croatian footballers
Croatia youth international footballers
Croatia under-21 international footballers
Croatia international footballers
NK Hrvatski Dragovoljac players
GNK Dinamo Zagreb players
Grazer AK players
SK Rapid Wien players
FK Austria Wien players
Croatian Football League players
Austrian Football Bundesliga players
Croatian expatriate footballers
Expatriate footballers in Austria
Croatian expatriate sportspeople in Austria